Medical Aid for Palestinians (MAP) is a British charity that offers medical services in the West Bank, Gaza and Lebanon, and advocates for Palestinians' rights to health and dignity. It is in special consultative status with ECOSOC since 2002.

Aim and history
Medical Aid for Palestinians' stated aim is to meet the humanitarian needs of the Palestinian people. The organization and its programmes have been supported by the British public, the UK Government (DfID), the European Union and international aid organizations. They deliver basic health and medical care to Palestinian refugees and they strive to establish permanent medical infrastructure in Palestinian communities by training health care practitioners, teaching medical vocational skills and addressing the requirements of particularly vulnerable groups such as people with disabilities.

MAP was founded in 1982 by Dr Swee Chai Ang FRCS, Major Derek Cooper, and his wife, Mrs Pamela Cooper, in the wake of the 1982 Sabra and Shatila massacre in Lebanon. Its president is Baroness Morris of Bolton who succeeded Lord Patten of Barnes and Helena Kennedy, Baroness Kennedy of The Shaws.

The organization has been embroiled in controversy, largely due to its founder's advocacy involving a White Supremacist video by David Duke. or

MAP's work

Programs
Medical Aid for Palestinians works with local non-governmental organizations and the Palestinian Health Service or provide practical medical support to Palestinians living under occupation or as refugees. Its programs cover the five priority areas in the occupied Palestinian territory and Palestinian refugee communities in Lebanon:
 Essential primary and public healthcare
 Women and children's health
 Emergency preparedness and response
 Mental health and psycho-social support
 Disability

Advocacy and campaigns 

MAP plays an active role in the UK raising awareness about violations of the Palestinian right to health, which is threatened by ongoing conflict, prolonged occupation and displacement. Working in coalition with other NGOs, the scope of MAP's advocacy programme ranges from raising public awareness to advocating on salient issues with governments and policy makers.

References

External links
 Medical Aid for Palestinians

Charities based in England
Development charities based in the United Kingdom
Organizations established in 1984
Non-governmental organizations involved in the Israeli–Palestinian conflict
Foreign charities operating in the State of Palestine